A landmark is a recognizable natural or artificial feature used for navigation, a feature that stands out from its near environment and is often visible from long distances.

In modern use, the term can also be applied to smaller structures or features, that have become local or national symbols.

Etymology

In old English the word landmearc (from land + mearc (mark)) was used to describe a boundary marker, an "object set up to mark the boundaries of a kingdom, estate, etc.". Starting from approx. 1560, this understanding of landmark was replaced by a more general one. A landmark became a "conspicuous object in a landscape".
A landmark literally meant a geographic feature used by explorers and others to find their way back or through an area. For example, the Table Mountain near Cape Town, South Africa is used as the landmark to help sailors to navigate around southern tip of Africa during the Age of Exploration. Artificial structures are also sometimes built to assist sailors in naval navigation. The Lighthouse of Alexandria and Colossus of Rhodes are ancient structures built to lead ships to the port.

In modern usage, a landmark includes anything that is easily recognizable, such as a monument, building, or other structure. In American English it is the main term used to designate places that might be of interest to tourists due to notable physical features or historical significance. Landmarks in the British English sense are often used for casual navigation, such as giving directions. This is done in American English as well.

In urban studies as well as in geography, a landmark is furthermore defined as an external point of reference that helps orienting in a familiar or unfamiliar environment. Landmarks are often used in verbal route instructions and as such an object of study by linguists as well as in other no fields of study.

Types

Landmarks are usually classified as either natural landmarks or man-made landmarks, both are originally used to support navigation on finding directions. A variant is a seamark or daymark, a structure usually built intentionally to aid sailors navigating featureless coasts.

Natural
Natural landmarks can be characteristic features, such as mountains or plateaus. Examples of natural landmarks are Table Mountain in South Africa, Mount Ararat in Turkey, Uluru in Australia, Mount Fuji in Japan and Grand Canyon in the United States. Trees might also serve as local landmarks, such as jubilee oaks or conifers. Some landmark trees may be nicknamed, examples being Queen's Oak, Hanging Oak or Centennial Tree.

Human made
In modern sense, landmarks are usually referred to as monuments or prominent distinctive buildings, used as the symbol of a certain area, city, or nation. Some examples include the Statue of Unity in Narmada, the White House in Washington, D.C., the Statue of Liberty in New York City, the Eiffel Tower in Paris, the Lotte World Tower in Seoul, the Colosseum in Rome, Big Ben in London, the Tsūtenkaku in Osaka, Christ the Redeemer in Rio de Janeiro, Bratislava Castle in Bratislava, the Space Needle in Seattle, the Sydney Harbour Bridge or the Sydney Opera House (both in Sydney), the Brandenburg Gate in Berlin, the Château Frontenac in Quebec (city), Place Stanislas in Nancy, the CN Tower in Toronto, or Palace of Culture and Science in Warsaw. Church spires and mosque's minarets are often very tall and visible from many miles around, thus often serve as built landmarks. Also town hall towers and belfries often have a landmark character.

See also
 Boundary marker
 Contemporary history
 Cultural heritage management
 Cultural heritage tourism
 National landmark (disambiguation)
 National symbol

References

External links

 
Navigational markers
Geography terminology